John Wise  (December 12, 1935 – January 9, 2013) was a Canadian dairy cattle farmer and politician from Ontario.

Early years 
Born in St. Thomas, Ontario, Wise was a dairy farmer and a local politician in St. Thomas - Elgin:

 Township councillor and deputy reeve of Yarmouth Township 1966-1967
 Reeve of Yarmouth Township 1967-1968
 Warden for Elgin County 1969

Federal politics 
Wise was first elected as a Progressive Conservative to the House of Commons of Canada representing the riding of Elgin in 1972. He was re-elected in 1974, 1979, 1980 and 1984. He was the Minister of Agriculture in both Joe Clark's cabinet (June 4, 1979 – March 2, 1980) and Brian Mulroney's cabinet (September 17, 1984 – September 14, 1988).

Retirement 
Wise retired as an MP in 1988 and retired to his farm (dairy operations sold in the 1970s). After leaving politics, he served on various agriculture related boards:
 Board member for Amtelcom
 Chairman of the board, Canadian Livestock Exporters Association and Canadian Embryo Exporters Association

Wise was honorary founder and President of Soil Conservation Canada and cattle judge in Elgin County.

Death 
Wise died on January 9, 2013, at the age of 77 in London, Ontario.

References

External links 
 
 Agriculture and Agri-Food Canada biography

1935 births
2013 deaths
Canadian farmers
Members of the 21st Canadian Ministry
Members of the 24th Canadian Ministry
Members of the House of Commons of Canada from Ontario
Progressive Conservative Party of Canada MPs
Members of the King's Privy Council for Canada
People from St. Thomas, Ontario
University of Guelph alumni